This is a list of amphibians of Europe. It includes all amphibians currently found in Europe. It does not include species found only in captivity or extinct in Europe, except where there is some doubt about this, nor does it currently include species introduced in recent decades. Each species is listed, with its binomial name and notes on its distribution where this is limited.

Summary of 2006 IUCN Red List categories.
Conservation status - IUCN Red List of Threatened Species:
 - Extinct,  - Extinct in the wild
 - Critically endangered,  - Endangered,  - Vulnerable
 - Near threatened,  - Least concern
 - Data deficient,  - Not evaluated
(v. 2013.2, the data is current as of March 5, 2014)

Salamanders
Family: Salamandridae (true salamanders and newts)
Fire salamander, Salamandra salamandra 
Penibetic salamander, Salamandra longirostris (Spain)
Corsican fire salamander, Salamandra corsica  (Corsica)
Alpine salamander, Salamandra atra  (France, the Alps, and Balkans)
Lanza's alpine salamander, Salamandra lanzai 
Karpathos salamander, Lyciasalamandra helverseni  (three Greek islands near Crete)
Luschan's salamander, Lyciasalamandra luschani  (Greek island of Kastellorizo)
Gold-striped salamander, Chioglossa lusitanica  (Spain and Portugal)
Spectacled salamander, Salamandrina terdigitata  (Italy) and:
Salamandrina perspicillata  (formerly in Salamandrina terdigitata, Italy)
Iberian ribbed newt, Pleurodeles waltl  (Iberian Peninsula, Morocco)
Pyrenean brook salamander, Calotriton asper  (Pyrenees)
Montseny brook newt, Calotriton arnoldi  (Spain)
Corsican brook salamander, Euproctus montanus  (Corsica)
Sardinian brook salamander, Euproctus platycephalus  (Sardinia)
Northern crested newt, Triturus cristatus 
Marbled newt, Triturus marmoratus  (Spain, Portugal and France)
Southern marbled newt, Triturus pygmaeus  (Spain and Portugal)
Italian crested newt, Triturus carnifex 
Southern crested newt, Triturus karelinii 
Balkan crested newt, Triturus ivanbureschi (Balkans, Turkey)
Macedonian crested newt, Triturus macedonicus (Balkans, Turkey)
Danube crested newt, Triturus dobrogicus 
Banded newt, Ommatotriton ophryticus (Caucasus, Turkey) 
Alpine newt, Ichthyosaura alpestris and: 
Ichthyosaura apuana (Italy, France) 
Ichthyosaura reiseri (Balkans, Romania) 
Ichthyosaura veluchiensis (Balkans) 
Carpathian newt, Lissotriton montandoni  (Carpathians)
Smooth newt, Lissotriton vulgaris  and:
Greek smooth newt, Lissotriton graecus (Balkans)
Smooth newt, Lissotriton meridionalis (Italy, Slovenia, and Croatia)
Schmidtler's smooth newt, Lissotriton schmidtleri (Turkey, Greece, Bulgaria)
Caucasian smooth newt, Lissotriton lantzi (Caucasus)
Bosca's newt, Lissotriton boscai (Portugal) 
Palmate newt, Lissotriton helveticus 
Italian newt, Lissotriton italicus 
Family: Hynobiidae (Asiatic salamanders)
Siberian salamander, Salamandrella keyserlingii  (Russia)
Family: Plethodontidae (lungless salamanders)
Cave salamander, Speleomantes strinatii  (France)
Brown cave salamander, Hydromantes genei  (France and Italy)
Italian cave salamander, Speleomantes italicus  (Italy)
Ambrosi's cave salamander, Speleomantes ambrosii  (Italy)
Monte Albo cave salamander, Speleomantes flavus  (Sardinia)
Imperial cave salamander, Speleomantes imperialis  (Sardinia) and:
Speleomantes sarrabusensis  (formerly in Speleomantes imperialis, Sardinia)
Supramonte cave salamander, Speleomantes supramontis  (Sardinia)
Family: Proteidae (waterdogs and mudpuppies)
Olm, Proteus anguinus  (Dinaric Alps)

Frogs and toads
Family: Bombinatoridae (fire-bellied toads)
European fire-bellied toad, Bombina bombina 
Apennine yellow-bellied toad, Bombina pachypus 
Yellow-bellied toad, Bombina variegata 
Family: Discoglossidae (disc-tongued frogs)
Iberian painted frog, Discoglossus galganoi 
Spanish painted frog, Discoglossus jeanneae 
Corsican painted frog, Discoglossus montalentii 
Painted frog, Discoglossus pictus  (Sicily and Malta)
Tyrrhenian painted frog, Discoglossus sardus 
Midwife toad, Alytes obstetricans  and:
Catalonian midwife toad, Alytes (obstetricans) almogavarii (Spain)
Iberian midwife toad, Alytes cisternasii 
Betic midwife toad, Alytes dickhilleni  (Spain)
Majorcan midwife toad, Alytes muletensis  (Majorca)
Family: Pipidae
African clawed frog, Xenopus laevis  (introduced)
Family: Pelobatidae (European spadefoot toads)
Eastern spadefoot, Pelobates syriacus  (south-eastern Europe) and:
Balkan spadefoot, Pelobates balcanicus (southern Europe)
Western spadefoot, Pelobates cultripes 
Common spadefoot, Pelobates fuscus  and:
Pallas' spadefoot toad, Pelobates vespertinus (Ukraine to Kazakhstan)
Common parsley frog, Pelodytes punctatus 
Iberian parsley frog, Pelodytes ibericus  (Iberian Peninsula)
Lusitanian parsley frog, Pelodytes atlanticus  (Portugal)
Caucasian parsley frog, Pelodytes caucasicus  (Caucasus region, Turkey)
Hesperides' parsley frog, Pelodytes hespericus (Spain)
Family: Bufonidae (true toads)
Common toad, Bufo bufo 
Giant toad, Bufo spinosus (Iberian Peninsula, France, Jersey)
Caucasian toad, Bufo verrucosissimus  (Caucasus, Turkey, Iran)
Natterjack toad, Bufo calamita 
Berber toad, Bufo mauritanicus  (Spain - introduced)
Former Bufo viridis group:
European green toad, Bufotes viridis  (in the past Pseudepidalea (Bufo) viridis, most of Europe) and:
Variable green toad, Bufotes sitibundus (Caucasus region, Russia, Kazakhstan)
Balearic green toad, Bufotes balearicus  (Italy, Mediterranean islands)
Varying toad, Bufotes variabilis  (currently not recognized, northern Europe, Greece, Caucasus region)
African green toad, Bufotes boulengeri  (Lampedusa) and:
Sicilian green toad, Bufotes (boulengeri) siculus  (Sicilia, Favignana and Ustica)
Cyprus green toad, Bufotes cypriensis (Cyprus)
Family: Hylidae (tree frogs and their allies)
Common tree frog, Hyla arborea 
Oriental tree frog, Hyla orientalis (eastern Europe, Turkey, Iran)
Italian tree frog, Hyla intermedia  and:
Po's tree frog, Hyla perrini (southern Europe)
Stripeless tree frog, Hyla meridionalis  (southern Europe)
Iberian tree frog, Hyla molleri (Iberian Peninsula, France)
Sardinian tree frog, Hyla sarda 
Family: Ranidae (true frogs)
Typical frogs
Common frog, Rana temporaria  and:
Rana parvipalmata (Spain)
Pyrenean frog, Rana pyrenaica 
Moor frog, Rana arvalis 
Agile frog, Rana dalmatina 
Italian agile frog, Rana latastei 
Italian stream frog, Rana italica 
Greek stream frog, Rana graeca 
Iberian frog, Rana iberica 
Long-legged wood frog, Rana macrocnemis  (Caucasus region, Turkey)
Water frogs
Marsh frog, Pelophylax ridibundus 
Pool frog, Pelophylax lessonae 
Edible frog, Pelophylax kl. esculentus 
Perez's frog, Pelophylax perezi 
Graf's hybrid frog, Pelophylax kl. grafi 
Italian pool frog, Pelophylax bergeri 
Italian edible frog, Pelophylax kl. hispanicus  (Italy)
Epirus water frog, Pelophylax epeiroticus 
Albanian water frog, Pelophylax shqipericus 
Karpathos frog, Pelophylax cerigensis  (Greece)
Cretan frog, Pelophylax cretensis  (Greece)
Cyprus water frog, Pelophylax cypriensis (Cyprus)
Balkan frog, Pelophylax kurtmuelleri 
Levant water frog, Pelophylax bedriagae 
Sahara frog, Pelophylax saharicus  (Gran Canaria - introduced)
American bullfrog, Lithobates catesbeianus  (introduced)

See also
List of birds of Europe
List of mammals of Europe
List of reptiles of Europe
List of extinct animals of Europe

Further reading
Arnold N., Ovenden D., Collins Field Guide: Reptiles & Amphibians Britain & Europe., HarperCollins Publishers, London, 2002, 
Engelmann W., Fritzsche J., Günthner R., Obst F., Beobachten und bestimmen: Lurche und Kriechtiere Europas, Neumann Verlag, Leipzig, Radebeul, 1985

Notes

References

External links

AmphibiaWeb Database. University of California, Berkeley, CA.

Amphibians
Amphibians
 Europe
Europe